Nicholaus John Michael Gordon (born October 28, 1991), better known by his stage name Lil Pappie, is a Canadian singer, rapper and songwriter of Dakota and European descent.

Career
In 2008, Lil Pappie appeared on the sixth season of Canadian Idol. On December 1, 2009, Pappie released his debut single "I Want Chu SSSo Bad". In October 2010, Pappie released his second single "Hypnotized". The track was recorded at Cherry Beach Sound in Toronto, Ontario. On June 18, 2011, Pappie performed at APTN's Aboriginal Day Live at The Forks in Winnipeg, Manitoba to an audience of over 10 000.

References

External links
 Official Lil Pappie website

First Nations musicians
Canadian pop singers
1991 births
Living people
Canadian male rappers
Musicians from London, Ontario
21st-century Canadian rappers
21st-century Canadian male musicians